Sibataniozephyrus is a genus of butterflies in the family Lycaenidae.

Species
Sibataniozephyrus fujisanus (Matsumura, 1910) Japan
Sibataniozephyrus kuafui Hsu & Lin, 1994 Taiwan
Sibataniozephyrus lijinae Hsu, 1995 China, Guizhou Prov., Tongren Prefecture, Mt. Fanjing, 1000-1350 m.

References

Theclini
Lycaenidae genera